Gapes Valley is a valley in the Canterbury Region in the South Island of New Zealand. Today Gapes Valley consists of a sparse grouping of houses, the hall and a recently established brewery.

History 
The valley was named after William Gapes (born in Saffron Walden, Essex, England; twin brother of James Gapes), who after working throughout the region settled on an  farm in the valley.  The valley was once home to a small post office. The Gapes Valley School was opened in 1882 though would later close with students moving to the nearby Hilton School.

Many roads in the area bear the names of pioneer families, some of whom have remained in the region, e.g. Halls, Loves, Patricks, Slacks and Wells.

References 

Timaru District
Populated places in Canterbury, New Zealand